Baldo De' Serofini (active middle 15th century) was an Italian painter of the Renaissance period, active in the Marche and Umbria.

Little is known of his biography. He is said to have been born in Perugia. He painted at least two canvases depicting a Madonna del Soccorso, one found in the Pinacoteca Civica Marco Moretti in Civitanova Marche, and the other for the Museo-Pinacoteca di Palazzo Lazzarini in Morrovalle in the Marche. He painted a Madonna and Child with Angels for the church of Santa Chiara in Cagli. He also painted devotional works found now in the Galleria Nazionale delle Marche in Urbino.

References

Year of birth unknown
Year of death unknown
Italian male painters
15th-century Italian painters
Italian Renaissance painters
Umbrian painters